U.S. Route 412 (abbreviated US-412) is a U.S. highway in the south-central portion of the United States, connecting Springer, New Mexico to Columbia, Tennessee. A  section of the highway crosses the state of Oklahoma, traversing the state from west to east. Entering the state southwest of Boise City, US-412 runs the length of the Oklahoma Panhandle and serves the northern portion of the state's main body, before leaving the state at West Siloam Springs. Along the way, the route serves many notable cities and towns, including Boise City, Guymon, Woodward, Enid, and the state's second-largest city, Tulsa.

US-412 has two tolled sections, both of them in Oklahoma—the Cimarron Turnpike and the Cherokee Turnpike. The tolled portions of the highway are operated by the Oklahoma Turnpike Authority (OTA), with the remainder of the route maintained by the Oklahoma Department of Transportation (ODOT). In addition to the freeway-grade turnpikes, a large amount of the highway has been upgraded to four-lane expressway facilities, although some portions remain two-lane, especially in the Panhandle. Much of US-412's route through Oklahoma either overlaps or is in close proximity to that of US-64.

US-412 was extended into Oklahoma in 1988 to encourage recreational travel and the resulting economic benefit to the state. This extension, in which the new designation replaced or overlapped several already existing highways, brought US-412's western terminus to Woodward. In 1993, it was extended west of Oklahoma, bringing it through the Panhandle and into New Mexico.

Route description

The Panhandle

U.S. Route 412 crosses the New Mexico–Oklahoma state line northeast of Clayton, New Mexico, concurrent with US-56 and US-64. The three highways enter the state just north of the extreme southwest corner of Cimarron County, the westernmost tip of the Oklahoma Panhandle. The highways head northeast, passing through disconnected parcels of the Rita Blanca National Grassland. The first town US-56, US-64, and US-412 encounter in Oklahoma is unincorporated Felt, which they skirt the northern edge of. The highways then cross the Beaver River before intersecting US-385, which joins the other three highways in a concurrency as they approach Boise City, the county seat. In Boise City, the highways reach a traffic circle which surrounds the Cimarron County Courthouse. At this traffic circle, US-56, US-64, and US-412 all turn east, while US-385 splits away to the north. State Highway 3 (SH-3) enters the circle from the north and leaves from the east, following US-412, while SH-325 begins at the circle and heads west toward Kenton. East of town, US-56/US-64/US-412/SH-3 have an interchange with US-287, which bypasses Boise City to the east.  northeast of here, US-56 splits away from the other highways; it continues northeast, while US-64/US-412/SH-3 turn onto a due east course.

The four highways cross the Beaver River once again before entering that city, Texas County's seat and the largest city in the Panhandle. In Guymon, US-64 splits away to the east, while US-412 and State Highways 3 and 136 continue south, turning back east along US-54 to form a short concurrency. A US-412 truck route follows US-64 and US-54 around the east side of the city, reuniting with mainline US-412 where it splits away from SH-136. Southwest of Optima Lake, the two highways serve as the southern terminus of SH-94. East of the highway junction, US-412/SH-3 enter Optima National Wildlife Refuge, where they cross Coldwater Creek, one of the lake's tributaries. After leaving the refuge, the routes pass through the town of Hardesty. From Hardesty, the road continues due east, crossing Palo Duro Creek and Chiquita Creek, two tributaries of the Beaver River. The highways then leave Texas County.

The third county US-412 and SH-3 enter is Beaver County, the panhandle's easternmost county. The highways' route across Beaver County is arrow-straight, proceeding due east with only a single curve at the extreme east edge of the county. Near the county's east–west midpoint, at Elmwood, US-412 and SH-3 intersect US-270 and SH-23. While SH-23 passes through the intersection north to south, eastbound US-270, following southbound SH-23 from Beaver, joins US-412/SH-3 heading east. The three highways continue on, passing through Slapout, before curving slightly to the north as they exit both Beaver County and the Oklahoma Panhandle.

Northwest Oklahoma

Upon entering the main body of Oklahoma, the first county US-270/US-412/SH-3 pass through is Harper County. US-270/US-412/SH-3 only cross the southwest part of Harper County before curving southeast into Ellis County. The routes, however, only clip the northeast corner of the county, traversing only  of it before passing into Woodward County.

Shortly after entering Woodward County, US-270/US-412/SH-3 enter the town of Fort Supply. There, the routes junction with US-183, which joins the other routes as they make their way southeast.  southeast of Fort Supply, the four highways enter the city of Woodward, the largest city within a nine-county area and the commercial hub of northwest Oklahoma. On the west edge of town, the four highways serve as the eastern terminus of the western segment of SH-15, a route made discontinuous by the establishment of US-412 (see history). US-270/US-183/US-412/SH-3 proceed east through Woodward. In downtown, they meet with SH-34; here, US-412 leaves the four-way concurrency, as it continues east by itself while the other three highways it has followed since Fort Supply turn south to overlap SH-34 instead. For the first time since its western terminus in New Mexico, where it began concurrent with US-56, US-412 is the sole highway designation on the road it follows.

As US-412 leaves town, it passes south of Boiling Springs State Park, running parallel to SH-34C and SH-50B, both of which serve the park. Along this stretch, it crosses the Beaver River for the third and final time, though this time it has since become the North Canadian River. SH-50 forms a concurrency with US-412 for  before splitting off again in Mooreland. The highway passes just south of Curtis as it continues east out of Woodward County.

The next northwestern Oklahoma county that US-412 serves is Major County. The first intersection with another highway that US-412 comes to is with US-281 at Bouse Junction. East of here, US-412 skirts the northern edge of the Glass Mountains (also known as the Gloss Mountains), turning southeast before returning to a due east course. At Orienta, the highway begins a concurrency with US-60 and SH-8; the three highways turn north and together cross the Cimarron River. South of Cleo Springs, US-60 and US-412 turn east, while SH-8 splits away to the north. US-60 and US-412 continue to the east, meeting up with SH-58 on the north edge of Ringwood. The two US highways pass through Meno before coming to the Major–Garfield County line.

Soon after entering Garfield County, US-60/US-412 run through Lahoma.  east of there, they share a brief concurrency with SH-132. The two highways enter the county seat of Garfield County, the city of Enid, along Owen K. Garriott Road, named in honor of the astronaut. In downtown Enid, the routes intersect US-81; US-60 breaks away from US-412 to turn north along US-81, while US-412 continues east along Garriott Road. On the east side of Enid, US-412 reunites with US-64; the two form a concurrency as Garriott Road becomes an expressway heading east out of town. The next highway junction is an interchange with SH-74; this interchange also serves as the western terminus of the eastern segment of SH-15. From here, US-64/US-412 proceed due east into Noble County to a cloverleaf interchange with Interstate 35 (I-35). US-64 follows I-35 south toward Perry, while US-412 continues straight ahead, where it will form the Cimarron Turnpike.

Northeast Oklahoma

The Cimarron Turnpike, carrying US-412, passes through Noble, Payne, and Pawnee Counties. The highway heads east from I-35 to its first interchange, Exit 3, which provides access to US-77. The first mainline toll plaza is just west of Exit 15, a cloverleaf interchange with no straight-line ramps (forcing all traffic getting on or off to pass through the toll plaza) connecting the turnpike to US-177. East of the US-177 interchange, the highway curves to the south, crossing Black Bear Creek. US-412 then meets US-64 once again, interchanging with it at Exit 23 east of Morrison. The turnpike then turns back east, with a spur route (accessible only from the westbound turnpike) branching off to the southwest toward Stillwater. The Lone Chimney service plaza, a twenty-four-hour concession area, is located in the median of the turnpike east of the interchange with the spur. South of Pawnee lies an interchange (Exit 37) with SH-18. Just south of Hallett, a second mainline toll plaza sits just west of the SH-99 interchange; again, this interchange is a cloverleaf interchange with only loop ramps. The turnpike's final exit is Exit 60, a partial interchange with SH-48 southeast of Cleveland. The missing movements are provided by US-64, the northern terminus of SH-48, which merges with US-412 as the Cimarron Turnpike ends. The two routes continue east as a freeway.

The US-64/US-412 freeway, known locally as the Keystone Expressway, serves the western outlying areas of the Tulsa metropolitan area. Passing south of Westport, the freeway is routed along a peninsula in extreme southeastern Pawnee County, before crossing Keystone Lake, formed by the impounded Arkansas River, into far southern Osage County. US-64 and US-412 only traverse a short distance in the county, however; after  the two routes pass into Tulsa County. Just south of the county line, the freeway has an interchange with SH-151, a short connector route that runs across Lake Keystone's dam.  At this interchange the Keystone Expressway ends. The Sand Springs Expressway continues from here, through Sand Springs, where it includes an interchange with SH-97 and SH-51, the latter of which joins US-64/US-412 on the freeway. The three routes then continue east into Tulsa proper.

The Sand Springs Expressway comes to an end at the northwest corner of the Inner Disperal Loop (IDL), a ring of freeways surrounding Downtown Tulsa. At a stack interchange there, US-64 and SH-51 split away to the south along I-244; this will be the final intersection US-412 and US-64 will have in Oklahoma. US-412 continues east along I-244. This interchange is also the southern terminus of L.L. Tisdale Parkway. I-244 and US-412 form the north side of the IDL; at its northeast corner, they interchange with US-75, the east side of the loop; south of the interchange, US-75 also carries the I-444 designation. I-244/US-412 continue east, with exit ramps to local streets, as well as SH-11 and US-169. I-244 ends at I-44/SH-66; US-412 forms a concurrency with the latter two routes as they continue east into Rogers County.

Upon entering Rogers County, I-44/US-412/SH-66 parallel the southern boundary of the county, staying just north of the Rogers–Tulsa and, further east, Rogers–Wagoner county lines. In Rogers County, the three highways enter the city of Catoosa, one of Tulsa's eastern suburbs. In Catoosa, the freeway serves as the southern terminus of SH-167, which serves the city's port, and SH-66 splits off toward Claremore. I-44 and US-412 continue east for a short distance before going separate directions; I-44 exits from US-412 and joins the Will Rogers Turnpike. This interchange is also the northern terminus of the Creek Turnpike. US-412 becomes an expressway, and continues east of the interchange, passing through Fair Oaks on its way out of the Tulsa metro. In rural south-central Rogers County, it connects to SH-412P, a state highway spur to Port 33, before crossing the Verdigris River, a component of the McClellan–Kerr Arkansas River Navigation System. US-412 then heads eastward out of Rogers County.

After leaving Rogers County, the next county along US-412 is Mayes County. South of Chouteau, the route provides access to US-69 via an interchange. Just west of US-412's crossing of the Grand River, the highway intersects SH-412B, which connects US-412 to SH-69A. After crossing the river, US-412 comes to a fork in the road; one half of the fork is the Cherokee Turnpike, which mainline US-412 follows, while the other is US-412 Alternate, which runs parallel to the turnpike on an old alignment of US-412.

The first interchange on the Cherokee Turnpike is with SH-82 in Locust Grove. The turnpike continues east, passing into Delaware County, to intersect US-412 Alternate again between Rose and Leach. East of this interchange, a service area lies in the median of the roadway; east of there, the highway passes through the Cherokee Turnpike's only mainline toll plaza. The turnpike's final interchange is with US-59 and SH-10 in Kansas. The Cherokee Turnpike then ends, merging with US-59; at this junction, US-412 Alternate, which was concurrent with US-59, also ends. US-59 and US-412 continue southeast through Flint, before turning due east to West Siloam Springs. There, US-59 splits away from US-412, while US-412 remains on an easterly trajectory, crossing the state line into Siloam Springs, Arkansas.

History
US-412 initially connected Walnut Ridge, Arkansas to Jackson, Tennessee. Mr. Murphy, deputy director of ODOT, recommended to the Transportation Commission that US-412 be extended into Oklahoma on February 1, 1988. ODOT hoped that establishing US-412 in Oklahoma would generate new recreational traffic, thus benefiting the state economically. The Transportation Commission approved the recommendation unanimously.

The US-412 designation was applied to preexisting Oklahoma highways. From Woodward to just east of Enid, US-412 replaced SH-15. From there to the I-35 junction, it was overlaid on US-64; east of I-35, the designation was applied to the Cimarron Turnpike. US-412 continued east from the end of the turnpike along US-64. From there, it was routed through the Tulsa metropolitan freeway system along I-244 and I-44. East of Tulsa, the highway replaced SH-33 to the Arkansas line. The highway designations made redundant by US-412 were removed, effective December 12, 1988.

The first major change to US-412 occurred on November 4, 1991, when US-412 was rerouted onto the newly built Cherokee Turnpike. US-412 Scenic, which was later redesignated US-412 Alternate, was established along the old highway, allowing the highway system to retain a free alternate to the new toll road. US-412 was extended west on May 5, 1993; like its initial extension into Oklahoma, this new portion of US-412 followed existing highways: US-56, US-64, US-270, and SH-3.

Subsequent changes to US-412 have been more minor. On March 7, 1994, the highway was relocated near Chouteau. Finally, on October 4, 2004, the Transportation Commission approved the realignment of US-60, US-412, and SH-8 at their junction near Orienta. Other than routine maintenance, there have been no further changes to the highway since then.

Future
On May 20, 2021, Senator Jim Inhofe, Republican of Oklahoma, introduced legislation to designate the portion of US-412 between I-35 in Noble County and I-49 in Springdale, Arkansas as a future Interstate. The bill, titled the "Future Interstate in Oklahoma and Arkansas Act", was cosponsored by senators John Boozman and Tom Cotton, both Republicans of Arkansas. The senators' stated reasons for seeking an Interstate designation along the US-412 included encouraging economic development, expanding opportunities for employment in the region, making travel safer and shipping easier, attracting new businesses, and better connecting rural and urban communities. Other supporters of the measure include the mayor of Tulsa, G. T. Bynum, and the heads of both ODOT and the Arkansas Department of Transportation (ArDOT). The language of the bill was later included in the Infrastructure Investment and Jobs Act.

Tolls
, passengers of two-axle vehicles (such as cars and motorcycles) pay a total of $3.00 to travel the entire length of the Cimarron Turnpike and $2.50 to travel the entire length of the Cherokee Turnpike. Tolls vary based on the entrance and exit used. Both turnpikes accept OTA's Pikepass transponder system as an alternative to cash payment. Pikepass customers receive discounted toll rates; the Pikepass rate for the full length of the Cimarron is $2.85, and the discounted rate for the Cherokee is $2.40.

Toll revenues from the two turnpikes US-412 uses are not necessarily used to maintain those highways. Under a practice known as cross-pledging, all OTA toll revenue is pledged against the sum of OTA's indebtedness, including bonds financing the state's other turnpikes.

Junction list

Spur routes
US-412 anchors three state highway spur routes in Oklahoma. These three routes all bear the number "412" with a letter suffix, on an Oklahoma state highway shield.

SH-412A

State Highway 412A is the only US-412 spur route to not directly connect to mainline US-412.

SH-412A begins at the Cherokee–Delaware county line in the town of Oaks. The route proceeds north through town. After leaving Oaks, the highway enters unincorporated territory before ending at US-412 Alternate at the unincorporated location of Twin Oaks.

SH-412A existed prior to the extension of US-412 in Oklahoma. As the adjacent section of highway was part of SH-33 prior to becoming US-412, what would become SH-412A was originally designated as SH-33C. SH-33C was first shown on the Oklahoma state highway map in 1958. At the time of the highway's designation, it was a gravel highway; by 1959, however, it had been paved. The first revision of the state highway map to reflect the renumbering of SH-33 to US-412 was the 1989 edition; this was also the first to show SH-33C redesignated as SH-412A.

SH-412B

State Highway 412B is a spur route of US-412 lying entirely within Mayes County.

SH-412B begins at US-412 just west of the Grand River bridge and the western terminus of the Cherokee Turnpike. From there, the highway follows a winding path to the north, passing east of Chouteau, before ending at SH-69A between MidAmerica Industrial Park to the west and Sportsmen Acres to the east.

The highway that is currently SH-412B was first shown on the official state map in 1987 as SH-33G, connecting to SH-33 at its southern terminus. By 1989, the first edition of the map to show US-412 in Oklahoma, SH-33G had been renumbered to SH-412B.

SH-412P

State Highway 412P is a spur of US-412 in Rogers County. SH-412P begins at US-412 heading south, then turns east. It then ends at Port 33 of the McClellan–Kerr Arkansas River Navigation System, along the Verdigris River. The highway does not appear on the official state map.

References

External links
US-412 at OKHighways

12-4
Transportation in Cimarron County, Oklahoma
Transportation in Texas County, Oklahoma
Transportation in Beaver County, Oklahoma
Transportation in Harper County, Oklahoma
Transportation in Ellis County, Oklahoma
Transportation in Woodward County, Oklahoma
Transportation in Major County, Oklahoma
Transportation in Garfield County, Oklahoma
Transportation in Noble County, Oklahoma
Transportation in Pawnee County, Oklahoma
Transportation in Payne County, Oklahoma
Transportation in Osage County, Oklahoma
Transportation in Tulsa County, Oklahoma
Transportation in Rogers County, Oklahoma
Transportation in Mayes County, Oklahoma
Transportation in Delaware County, Oklahoma
Transportation in Tulsa, Oklahoma
 Oklahoma